The 2015 Primera División season (Torneo de Adecuación) is the 34th professional season of Venezuela's top-flight football league.

Teams

Torneo de Adecuación 
The Torneo de Adecuación will be the tournament of the season. It began on July 12, 2015 and ended on December 13, 2015.

Standings

Knockout rounds

Relegation playoff

External links 
Official website of the Venezuelan Football Federation 
Season regulations 
Football-Lineups 

2014 in South American football leagues
2015 in South American football leagues
Venezuelan Primera División seasons
2015 in Venezuelan football